Playmates is a 1918 American silent comedy film featuring Oliver Hardy.

Cast
 Billy West as Kid
 Oliver Hardy as Kid (as Babe Hardy)
 Bud Ross
 Fay Holderness
 Ethelyn Gibson
 Ethel Marie Burton
 Myrtle Lind
 Charley Chase as Dope fiend (as Charles Parrott)

See also
 Oliver Hardy filmography

External links

1918 films
American silent short films
American black-and-white films
1918 comedy films
1918 short films
Silent American comedy films
American comedy short films
1910s American films